O-Town is an American boy band formed in 2000.

O-Town may also refer to:
 O-Town (album), a 2001 release by the same band
 O-Town (film), a 2015 Nigerian crime gangster film
 O-Town, a fictional town in the animated series Rocko's Modern Life

Place nicknames
 Oakland, California
 Ogden, Utah
 Olathe, Kansas
 Olympia, Washington
 Omaha, Nebraska
 Orange, Connecticut
 Orlando, Florida
 Ottawa, Kansas
 Ottawa, Ontario
 Owerri, Nigeria
 O'Fallon, Missouri